Francis Baldacchino (June 6, 1937 – October 9, 2009) was the first Roman Catholic bishop of the Roman Catholic Diocese of Malindi, Kenya.

Biography
Born in Marsa, Malta, Baldacchino was ordained to the priesthood for the Friars Minor Capuchins on March 18, 1961. He went on a mission in Kenya in 1974. Between 1984 and 1990 he was Superior of the Capuchin mission in Kenya. Among his achievements, he organised and strengthened the formation of local Capuchins, especially by building a postulancy house in Mpeketoni and a major seminary in Nairobi. On June 2, 2000, Pope John Paul II appointed Baldacchino bishop and he was ordained on September 2, 2000. In 2010 he returned to Malta for medical treatment. He died a month later on October 9. His funeral took place in St John's Co-Cathedral on October 13 and was buried in the Addolorata cemetery in Paola, Malta. In 2011 his body was exhumed and reburied in Floriana.

References

1937 births
2009 deaths
21st-century Roman Catholic bishops in Kenya
Capuchin bishops
20th-century Maltese Roman Catholic priests
Burials at Addolorata Cemetery, Paola
Roman Catholic bishops of Malindi
People from Marsa, Malta